Cardinal sign may refer to:
 Cardinal sign (astrology), a way of classifying astrological signs
 Cardinal signs, major diagnostic signs in medicine